Bruce A. Wallace (April 20, 1905 – March 4, 1977) was an American politician who served in the New Jersey Senate from 1942 to 1944 and from 1948 to 1955.

A resident of Cherry Hill, New Jersey, Wallace was raised in Merchantville, New Jersey, attended Camden High School and earned his degree in law from the South Jersey Law School (now part of Rutgers Law School).

References

1905 births
1977 deaths
Camden High School (New Jersey) alumni
Majority leaders of the New Jersey Senate
New Jersey lawyers
People from Merchantville, New Jersey
Politicians from Cherry Hill, New Jersey
Presidents of the New Jersey Senate
Republican Party New Jersey state senators
Rutgers School of Law–Camden alumni
20th-century American politicians
20th-century American lawyers